Owen Brennan (18 August 1877 – 26 January 1961) was an Australian rules footballer who played with Collingwood in the Victorian Football League (VFL).

Notes

External links 

		
Owen Brennan's profile at Collingwood Forever

1877 births
1961 deaths
Australian rules footballers from Melbourne
Collingwood Football Club players
People from Collingwood, Victoria